Ölschnitz may refer to:

Ölschnitz (Red Main), headstream of the Red Main, Bavaria, Germany
Ölschnitz (White Main), headstream of the White Main, Bavaria, Germany